Juanita Chambers (1956–2016) was a professional American bridge player from Schenectady, New York. She was world champion three times.

Born Juanita Tah in Ponca City, Oklahoma, to an Apache father. She married Neil Chambers in 1983. She also competed as Juanita Skelton.

Chambers died on July 29, 2016, in Dallas at age 60.

Bridge accomplishments

Awards
 Fishbein Trophy (1) 1992

Wins
 Venice Cup (1) 1987 
 World Mixed Pairs Championship (1) 1990
 World Olympiad Women's Teams Championship (1) 1996
 North American Bridge Championships (18)
 Keohane North American Swiss Teams (1) 1990 
 Machlin Women's Swiss Teams (4) 1987, 1991, 1994, 1996 
 Sternberg Women's Board-a-Match Teams (2) 1991, 1993 
 Chicago Mixed Board-a-Match (3) 1984, 1989, 1992 
 Rockwell Mixed Pairs (1) 1979 
 Wagar Women's Knockout Teams (6) 1985, 1989, 1992, 1995, 2000, 2001 
 Whitehead Women's Pairs (1) 1995

Runners-up
 North American Bridge Championships (9)
 Machlin Women's Swiss Teams (2) 2000, 2016 
 Rockwell Mixed Pairs (1) 1987 
 Smith Life Master Women's Pairs (1) 1995 
 Wagar Women's Knockout Teams (4) 1986, 1990, 1997, 1998

Notes

External links
 

1956 births
2016 deaths
American contract bridge players
Venice Cup players
Sportspeople from Schenectady, New York